The 2021–22 Fairfield Stags men's basketball team represented Fairfield University in the 2021–22 NCAA Division I men's basketball season. The Stags, led by third-year head coach Jay Young, played their home games at Webster Bank Arena in Bridgeport, Connecticut as members of the Metro Atlantic Athletic Conference.

Previous season
The Stags finished the 2020–21 season 10–17, 7–11 in MAAC play to finish in a tie for sixth place. As the No. 7 seed in the MAAC tournament, they defeated No. 10 seed Manhattan in the first round, upset No. 2 seed Monmouth in the quarterfinals, upset No. 3 seed Saint Peter's in the semifinals to reach the championship game. There, they lost to No. 9 seed Iona.

Roster

Schedule and results

|-
!colspan=12 style=""| Regular season

|-
!colspan=9 style=""| MAAC tournament

Sources

References

Fairfield Stags men's basketball seasons
Fairfield Stags
Fairfield Stags men's basketball
Fairfield Stags men's basketball